HMS Ithuriel was an  built for the Turkish Navy, but was purchased by the Royal Navy in 1939.

Description
The I-class ships were improved versions of the preceding H-class. They were powered by two Parsons geared steam turbines, each driving one propeller shaft, using steam provided by three Admiralty three-drum boilers. Their crew numbered 145 officers and ratings.

The ships mounted four 4.7-inch (120 mm) Mark IX guns in single mounts, designated 'A', 'B', 'X' and 'Y' from bow to stern. While under construction, their anti-aircraft (AA) armament was augmented by a single 12-pounder AA gun that replaced the planned aft set of torpedo tubes. In addition the intended pair of quadruple mounts for the 0.5 inch Vickers Mark III machine gun were replaced by a pair of  Oerlikon light AA guns. The Turkish ships were fitted with a single above-water quadruple torpedo tube mount amidships for  torpedoes. One depth charge rack and two throwers were fitted for 35 depth charges. The Turkish ships were fitted with the ASDIC sound detection system to locate submarines underwater and a Type 286 search radar.

Construction and career
Ithuriel was laid down as Gayret for the Turkish Navy by Vickers Armstrong at their Barrow-in-Furness shipyard on 24 May 1939, but taken over by the Royal Navy on the outbreak of the Second World War whilst still under construction. She was launched on 15 December 1940 and commissioned on 3 March 1942. In the Second World War, she took part in Operation Harpoon and Operation Pedestal, the escorting of convoys to Malta in June and August 1942.

Ithuriel was attacked by German aircraft at Bone in Algeria on night of 27–28 November 1942 and damaged beyond repair. On 29 November she was beached and temporary repairs were started. In January 1943 repairs proceeded enough to allow towing. On 27 February the destroyer was towed to Algiers for survey. In March Ithuriel was declared beyond local repair and laid up at Algiers.

In August, she was prepared for tow to Gibraltar. On 18 August, she sailed under tow from Algiers to Gibraltar. That September Ithuriel was placed in Care and maintenance for use at Gibraltar. In October, she was deployed at Gibraltar for accommodation and training duties.

In July 1944 the vessel was prepared for tow to the United Kingdom. On 1 August, Ithuriel began her passage to Plymouth under tow by the tug Prosperous. On 8 August, she was paid off on arrival at Plymouth. and placed on the Disposal List. The destroyer was sold to the British Iron & Steel Corporation for demolition by P & W McLellan. On 11 August Ithuriel made her final voyage to Bo'ness, near Edinburgh. She arrived on 13 August at the breaker's yard. (Discrepancy in records as to whether sold for scrap in 1944 or 1945.)

Notes

Bibliography
 
 
 
 
 
 
 
 
 

 

Demirhisar-class destroyers
I-class destroyers of the Royal Navy
Ships built in Barrow-in-Furness
1940 ships
World War II destroyers of the United Kingdom
Destroyers sunk by aircraft
World War II shipwrecks in the Mediterranean Sea
Maritime incidents in November 1942
Ships sunk by German aircraft